Meghnad Badh Rahasya (English:The Mystery of the Murder of Meghnad) is a 2017 Indian Bengali-language suspense thriller film directed by Anik Dutta with Debojyoti Mishra as music director. It was the third movie of Dutta which was released on 14 July 2017. It is said that the film was loosely based on Meghnad Badh Kavya with a few legendary references from The Ramayana.

Plot  
Famous writer Professor Asimavo Bose disappears under mysterious circumstances. All his allies including his wife Indrani, son Wrik, step-daughter Guli, assistant Elena and nephew Dheeman, have some ulterior motive of harming him. Asimavo was a political activist in student life and has his own share of secrets that reveal his dark past. The only clue to this mystery is a copy of Meghnad Badh Kavya which he gets as an unnamed gift on his birthday. The question remains: who did it? how? and most importantly, why?

Cast 
 Sabyasachi Chakrabarty as Prof. Asimavo Bose
 Abir Chatterjee as Kunal Sen
 Gargi Roychowdhury as Indrani Bose
 Vikram Chatterjee as Wrik Bose
 Saayoni Ghosh as Elena
 Kamaleshwar Mukherjee as Badal Biswas
 Sauraseni Maitra as Guli, Asimavo's step-daughter
 Kalyan Ray as Asimavo's friend
 Swati Sengupta as Janaki

References

External links
 

2017 films
Bengali-language Indian films
2010s Bengali-language films
Indian crime thriller films
Indian detective films
Films directed by Anik Dutta
2017 crime thriller films